Thivolleo rubritactalis is a moth in the family Crambidae. It was described by George Hampson in 1918, under the name "Hapalia Rubritactalis". It is found in Tanzania.

References

Moths described in 1918
Pyraustinae
Moths of Africa